Carsten Busch (born 7 August 1980 in Rostock) is a German former professional footballer who played as a goalkeeper.

Busch made an appearance in both the 2. Bundesliga and the 3. Liga during his stint at 1. FC Union Berlin before moving to FSV 63 Luckenwalde.

References

External links 
 

1980 births
Living people
Sportspeople from Rostock
German footballers
Association football goalkeepers
2. Bundesliga players
3. Liga players
Hertha Zehlendorf players
FC Hansa Rostock players
SV Babelsberg 03 players
1. FC Union Berlin players
Berliner FC Dynamo players
Footballers from Mecklenburg-Western Pomerania